Elizaveta "Liz" Parnov (née Parnova born 9 May 1994 in Moscow) is a Russian-born athlete who competed for Australia in the pole vault at the Olympics, World Championships and Commonwealth Games.

Early years 
Parnov came from a family of athletes and particularly pole vaulters. She is the niece of Tatiana Grigorieva, who won the silver medal for Australia in the women's pole vault at the 2000 Summer Olympics, and the granddaughter of Natalya Pechonkina, who won the bronze medal for the USSR in the women's 400m at the 1968 Summer Olympics. 

Parnov moved to Australia with her family in 1996, at the age of two. She was a competitive pole vaulter from the age of nine, where she vaulted 2.65m. She set two world age bests at 11 years (3.15m in 2005) and 12 years (3.64m in 2006). She cleared four metres just days after her 14th birthday in 2008.

In 2010, she competed at the first Youth Olympic Games and won silver,  jumping 4.40m weeks before she turned 16 years old. She was selected to be the Australian flag bearer.  Parnov then competed at the 2010 Delhi Commonwealth Games.

Career 
Parnov won a silver medal at the 2011 World Youth Championships in Athletics, held in Lille.

Her personal best of 4.50 metres, achieved on 17 February 2012 at Perth, is the Australian under-20 record, surpassing the record of her sister that she had tied in winning the Australian National Championship in 2010.  While she was still age 17 at the time of the jump, which surpassed the World Youth Record, she was not eligible for the record because she turned 18 in 2012.

At the 2020 Olympic Games her best height was 4.4m which meant that she was placed 12th in her qualifier. Parnov was eliminated from the pole vault qualifiers in controversial circumstances as officials failed to stop proceedings as rain tumbled down. She was forced to try her third attempt at 4.40m as the rain steadily increased. and in slippery, wet conditions was forced to abandon her next jump.

In December 2022 Parnov announced via her Instagram that she was “excited to embark on the next chapter of my life - how lucky am I to have lived one as a pole vaulter and now I get to begin the rest of my life”. Around the same time Parnov was confirmed as a contestant on reality TV show Australian Survivor to be broadcast in January 2023 on Network 10.

Personal life 

She was coached by her father Alex Parnov, himself a former world class pole vaulter. Her older sister Vicky also competes in pole vault and is the 2012 Australian national champion.

Achievements

See also
Athletics in Australia

References

External links

1994 births
Living people
Australian female pole vaulters
Russian emigrants to Australia
Athletes (track and field) at the 2010 Summer Youth Olympics
Athletes (track and field) at the 2012 Summer Olympics
Olympic athletes of Australia
Athletes from Moscow
Commonwealth Games competitors for Australia
Athletes (track and field) at the 2010 Commonwealth Games
Athletes (track and field) at the 2014 Commonwealth Games
Athletes (track and field) at the 2018 Commonwealth Games
Athletes (track and field) at the 2020 Summer Olympics
Australian Survivor contestants